This article lists the main modern pentathlon events and their results for 2005.

International modern pentathlon events
 May 26: 2005 CISM Modern Pentathlon Championships in  Prague
 Note: There was no women's individual event here.
 Winner:  Michal Sedlecky
 December 3: 2005 NORDECA Modern Pentathlon Championships in  Guatemala City
 Individual winners:  Niul Manske (m) /  Katia Rodriguez (f)

World modern pentathlon events
 July 27 & 28: 2005 World Junior Modern Pentathlon Champipnships in  Moscow
 Junior Individual winners:  Ádám Marosi (m) /  Lena Schöneborn (f)
 August 3 – 5: 2005 World Modern Pentathlon Championships in  Warsaw
 Individual winners:  Qian Zhenhua (m) /  Claudia Corsini (f)
 Men's Team Relay winners:  (Sandor Fulep, Ákos Kállai, & Viktor Horváth)
 Women's Team Relay winners:  (Elena Reiche, Lena Schöneborn, & Kim Raisner)
 August 26: 2005 World Youth "A" Modern Pentathlon Championships in  Plzeň
 Youth Individual winners:  Yasser Hefny (m) /  Zsofia Bartalis (f)

Continental modern pentathlon events
 June 19: 2005 European Junior Modern Pentathlon Championships in  Montepulciano
 Junior Individual winners:  Pavlo Kirpulyanskyy (m) /  Amélie Cazé (f)
 June 22: 2005 European Modern Pentathlon Championships in  Montepulciano
 Individual winners:  Edvinas Krungolcas (m) /  Aleksandra Sadovnikova (f)
 Men's Team Relay winners:  (Gábor Balogh, Sandor Fulep, & Ákos Kállai)
 June 28 & 29: 2005 European Youth "B" Modern Pentathlon Championships in  Montepulciano
 Youth Individual winners:  Michal Stefanski (m) /  Joanna Gomolinska (f)
 July 8: 2005 European Youth "A" Modern Pentathlon Championships in  Budapest
 Youth Individual winners:  Szymon Staśkiewicz (m) /  Zsofia Bartalis (f)
 September 22: 2005 Asian Modern Pentathlon Championships in  Almaty
 Individual winners:  KIM Ki-hyun (m) /  Galina Dolgushina (f)
 October 10: 2005 Pan American Junior Modern Penatathlon Championships in  Buenos Aires
 Note: There was no women's individual event here.
 Winner:  Marco Martínez
 October 10: 2005 Pan American Modern Pentathlon Championships in  Buenos Aires
 Individual winners:  Eli Bremer (m) /  Sheila Taormina (f)

2005 Modern Pentathlon World Cup
 March 12 & 13: MPWC #1 in  Acapulco
 Individual winners:  Gábor Balogh (m) /  Amélie Cazé (f)
 April 24: MPWC #2 for Women in  Székesfehérvár
 Winner:  Anastasiya Prokopenko
 April 29: MPWC #2 for Men in  Leipzig
 Winner:  Andrey Moiseyev
 May 13: MPWC #3 for Men in  Budapest
 Winner:  Andrejus Zadneprovskis
 May 13: MPWC #3 for Women in  Paris
 Winner:  Zsuzsanna Vörös
 July 8: MPWC #4 in  Athens
 Individual winners:  Eric Walther (m) /  Tatsiana Mazurkevich (f)
 August 20 & 21: MPWC #5 (final) in  Uppsala
 Individual winners:  Edvinas Krungolcas (m) /  Claudia Corsini (f)

References

External links
 Union Internationale de Pentathlon Moderne Website (UIPM)

 
Modern pentathlon
2005 in sports